Otis Colwell (born ca. 1797) was an American merchant and politician in the early years of the U.S. state of Wisconsin.  He was a member of the Wisconsin State Assembly for the 1849 session, representing the village of Southport (now part of the city of Kenosha) and southeast Racine County (now eastern Kenosha County).

Background 
Colwell was born in Massachusetts approximately 1797 (in January 1849 he was 52 years of age). He came to Wisconsin Territory in 1844, and operated a store in Southport.

Politics and legislature 
In 1848 he was elected to the second session of the Wisconsin legislature from the district consisting of the Towns of Pike, Pleasant Prairie, and Southport, succeeding Julius L. Gilbert, a Democrat. At that time he is described as being 52 years old, as a native of Massachusetts, and a merchant. He was succeeded in the 1850 session by Samuel Hale, at that time a Democrat, but who would later join the Free Soil Party himself.

In 1852 he was one of two elected justices of the peace for what was now named the City of Kenosha.

Later life 
A house built for Colwell in 1853 is still standing, at what is now 6215 7th Avenue in the City of Kenosha.

Colwell spent a brief period (part of 1861) as Head Keeper of the Kenosha Light lighthouse in Kenosha Harbor; he was the second of three men to be Head Keeper in that year.

References 

1790s births
American merchants
Businesspeople from Wisconsin
Politicians from Kenosha, Wisconsin
People from Massachusetts
Wisconsin Free Soilers
19th-century American politicians
Year of birth missing
Year of death missing
American justices of the peace
Democratic Party members of the Wisconsin State Assembly